Xanthoparmelia elixii is a lichen in the family Parmeliaceae, and found in South Australia.

It was first formally described in 1984 by Rex Filson, and the species epithet elixii honours the Australian chemist and lichenologist John Alan Elix.

See also
List of Xanthoparmelia species

References

External links
What is a lichen?, Australian National Botanical Garden

elixii
Lichen species
Lichens of Australia
Lichens described in 1984
Taxa named by Rex Bertram Filson